Mu'in al-Din Ali Husayni Sarabi Tabrizi, commonly known by his laqab (honorific title) of Qasim-i Anvar (1356 – 1433) was a Sufi mystic, poet, and a leading da'i (preacher) of the Safavid order.

Biography 
Born in 1356 in Sarab in the Azerbaijan region, According to the historians H. Javadi and K. Burrill / Encyclopædia Iranica, Mu'in al-Din Ali was a native speaker of Azeri Turkish, while the historians Siavash Lornejad and Ali Doostzadeh state that he was most likely a native speaker of Fahlavi. Mu'in al-Din Ali preferred to use Persian, which he was fluent in. He grew up in the neighbouring city of Tabriz, where he received his education. In his mid-teens, he became a disciple of Sadr al-Din Musa (died 1391), who was the head of the Safavid order.  

Due to a vision seen by Mu'in al-Din Ali, he was given the laqab (honorific title) Qasim-i Anvar ("Distributor of Lights") by Sadr al-Din Musa. Following his completion of his training at the city of Ardabil, Qasim-i Anvar given the khirqa by Sadr al-Din Musa. This cloak granted Qasim-i Anvar the right to convert others to his faith and offer spiritual teaching. Qasim-i Anvar later stayed in Gilan for some time as a missionary, and then went to Khurasan. He initially stayed at Nishapur, but was forced to move to Herat due to facing hostility from the ulama (clergy). According to his own writings, Qasim-i Anvar had established himself at Herat by 1377/78, and would stay there until his banishment in 1426/27.

Following his banishment from Herat, Qasim-i Anvar went to the city of Samarkand, where he stayed at the court of Shahrukh's son, Ulugh Beg (died 1449). A few years later, Qasim-i Anvar went back to Khurasan, where he died at Kharjird in October/November 1433.

Works 
Qasim-i Anvar composed several mystical treatises, ghazals, ruba'is, and mathnawis. The vast majority of his poems were in Persian. Some of them were in Azeri Turkish and Gilaki. His poems in Azeri Turkish may have only been written during his stay in Khurasan, in order to promote the Safavid order, and due to both Turkic and Persian experiencing a "literary renaissance." However, it may also indicate the rise of bilingualism in Qasim-i Anvar's birth region, where Fahlavi and Turkic speakers started to get in touch with each other.

References

Sources
 
 
 
 

Azerbaijani-language poets
Persian-language poets
1426 deaths
1365 births
People from Sarab, East Azerbaijan
Poets from the Timurid Empire